Professor Cheryl Merle de la Rey is a South African academic who, since 2019, has been vice-chancellor of University of Canterbury in New Zealand.  She was formerly Vice-Chancellor of the University of Pretoria in South Africa and has a distinguished career as a leader in South African higher education.

Early life and education

Professor Cheryl de la Rey attended the University of Natal, obtaining a Bachelor of Arts in 1983, Bachelor of Arts Honours in 1984 and Master of Arts in 1986, all cum laude. She is a qualified Psychologist.

Research and career
Professor De la Rey's research focused on race and gender, especially the construction of gender and gender-based violence.

A registered psychologist [by the Health Professions Council of South Africa], Professor De la Rey is a fellow of the Psychological Association of South Africa, a fellow of the Royal Society of South Africa and of the Academy of Science of South Africa.

Professor De la Rey spent time as Deputy Vice-Chancellor at the University of Cape Town before being named Vice-Chancellor and Principal of the University of Pretoria in November 2009, replacing Calie Pistorius.

In October 2020, De la Rey was the subject of a letter critical of an attempt by the University of Canterbury to review the work of Anne-Marie Brady concerning Chinese Communist Party influence in New Zealand.

References

External links
 Cheryl de la Rey – Who's Who SA

University of Natal alumni
Vice-Chancellors of the University of Pretoria
Academic staff of the University of Pretoria
University of Cape Town alumni
Living people
Year of birth missing (living people)
Vice-Chancellors of the University of Canterbury